And the Band Played On... is the fourth album by Pittsburgh pop/rock band the Jaggerz, released in 1998. It was their first album since their regrouping nine years earlier. It contains new recordings of songs from the group's three original studio albums.

Track listing 
 "Together" – 3:34
 "Move Across the River" – 3:16
 "Feels Good" – 4:44
 "Let Me Be Your Man" –  4:10
 "Don't Waste Your Time" – 3:24
 "Stand in for Love/Please Baby Please" – 7:02
 "Love Music" –  4:35
 "I'll Never Forget You" – 3:37
 "Kiss and Say Goodbye" –  4:36
 "Gotta Find My Way Back Home" – 3:47

Personnel 
 Jimmie Ross - lead/background vocals, bass
 Benny Faiella - guitar, background vocals
 Jim Pugliano - drums, background vocals
 Dennis AcAbee - guitar
 Hermie Granati - keyboards, string and horn synthesizers, lead/background vocals, orchestrations
 Jamie Peck - sweet saxes
 David Granati - guitar ("Feels Good" and "Love Music")
This is the first Jaggerz album not to feature Donnie Iris, who, after a stint with Wild Cherry, began a successful solo career.

References 

1998 albums
The Jaggerz albums